Anthonia Marie "Anke" Rijnders (born 23 August 1956) is a former butterfly and freestyle swimmer from the Netherlands, who competed for her native country at the 1972 Summer Olympics. As a member of the Dutch relay teams she finished in fifth place, both in the 4 × 100 m medley and the 4 × 100 m freestyle. On her personal starts, Rijnders finished in seventh (200 m freestyle) and eighth (400 m freestyle) place.

The same year she set three European records, in the 200 m and 400 m freestyle and 4 × 100 m medley relay.

She married the water polo player Wouter Gerritse and changed her last name to Gerritse. Their son, Willem Wouter Gerritse, is also a water polo player.

References

1956 births
Living people
Dutch female butterfly swimmers
Dutch female freestyle swimmers
Olympic swimmers of the Netherlands
Swimmers at the 1972 Summer Olympics
European Aquatics Championships medalists in swimming
Sportspeople from Amersfoort
20th-century Dutch women
20th-century Dutch people